Dylan Dauzat (born November 2, 1997) is an Owner & Operator of a Statewide Residential/Commercial Building Inspection company & is also a Real Estate Investor & Developer. Dylan has a net worth of $2.4 million as of 2022. Although possessing an accumulated 3.5 Million followers, Dylan stepped away fully from social media in 2017 to study a new career path. As reported, his State Wide Inspection Company has inspected over $100 Million Dollars worth of Real Estate since the launch of the company. His Real Estate Investment Company's portfolio include multiple Multi-Family Apartment Complex's & Rental Houses.

Career 
Dauzat created his YouTube channel on December 29, 2012, after receiving a camera as a Christmas gift that same year. He garnered attention from his YouTube videos, subsequently moving from Louisiana to West Hollywood, Los Angeles to pursue a career in modelling.

In 2014, he signed a deal with INTOUR. The following year, in 2015, he was featured in both the Slaybells:ICE and Digifest tours by DIGItour.

He has appeared at the American Music Awards for two consecutive years in 2014 and 2015.

In February 2016, Magcon announced they had signed a deal with Dauzat. Dauzat made his decision to depart in June 2016 to sign with DIGItour on a nationwide 28 city tour.

In 2017, he began his working relationship with Disney, first appearing in the television series Hyperlinked.

As of June 2018, his YouTube channel has over 700,000 subscribers with more than 37.4 million views. He currently has over 1.3 million followers on Instagram, more than 734,000 followers on Twitter, and over 275,000 followers on Facebook. He holds the distinction of being ranked #21 Most Famous Viner. He has maintained an audience of over 1.6 million followers on the video sharing site.

Music 
On November 1, 2014, Dauzat released his first official track on iTunes, "Kickin It", reaching a Top Ten position on the iTunes charts within 24 hours after release. He followed up with a music video shortly thereafter.

On February 14, 2015, Dauzat released his single "Mine Tonight" from his debut EP Magnetic. On June 4, 2015, "Mine Tonight" was released under Dauzat's own label.

Philanthropy 
Dauzat supports a number of charitable organizations and causes, including:
 Children's hospitals
 DoSomething.org, an anti-bullying non-profit organization
 Ryan Seacrest Foundation

Filmography

Discography

References

External links 
 Dylan Dauzat IMDb
 Dylan Dauzat on Instagram

Interviews 
'Dylan Dauzat Is Your Next Favorite Artist. Here's Why'
'Chat Talk. Five Minutes With Dylan Dauzat'
'Glitter Interview With Dylan Dauzat'
'You Got That With Dylan Dauzat'
'Magnetic – Interview With Dylan Dauzat'
'Dylan Dauzat Talks Single "Mine Tonight" And Digifest Tour Dates Ahead'
'Dylan Dauzat Is The YouTuber Everyone Should Be On The Lookout For'

1997 births
Living people
21st-century American male actors
American film producers
American Internet celebrities
American male child actors
American male models
American male pop singers
American male television actors
Cajun people